"Talking to You" is a 2016 song by English soul singer Izzy Bizu from her debut album A Moment of Madness. To date, it is her highest charting single in the UK and Scotland.

Charts

External links
YouTube video for "Talking to You"
Official Charts for "Talking to You"

2016 songs
2016 singles
Izzy Bizu songs